Christopher David Hoeger (born 15 January 1985) is an American-born luger who competed for Venezuela in the men's singles event at the 2002 Winter Olympics, placing 31st. His wife is Michelle Despain and his father is Werner Hoeger.

References

External links
 

1985 births
Living people
Venezuelan male lugers
Olympic lugers of Venezuela
Lugers at the 2002 Winter Olympics
People from Odessa, Texas